Ruru may refer to:

Places
Ruru, Nepal
Ruru, New Zealand

People
Rouran, an ancient nomadic race from the Mongolian steppes, also called Juan Juan
Ruru Madrid, a Filipino teen actor

Others
Māori name for the morepork owl
A Kanohi from the LEGO BIONICLE series
Ruru Amour (ルールー・アムール), a character from Hugtto! PreCure